Mahesh Kumara (born 23 April 1999) is a Sri Lankan cricketer. He made his List A debut on 14 December 2019, for Sri Lanka Army Sports Club in the 2019–20 Invitation Limited Over Tournament. He made his Twenty20 debut on 8 January 2020, for Sri Lanka Army Sports Club in the 2019–20 SLC Twenty20 Tournament. He made his first-class debut on 31 January 2020, for Sri Lanka Army Sports Club in the 2019–20 Premier League Tournament.

References

External links
 

1999 births
Living people
Sri Lankan cricketers
Sri Lanka Army Sports Club cricketers
Place of birth missing (living people)